Farstream (previously known as Farsight) is an audio/video conferencing framework based on GStreamer. The project provides audio/video conferencing for as many instant messengers as possible through a modular design. Telepathy and Farsight constitute the first implementation of the Jingle XMPP protocol.

The software is open-source, being distributed under the GNU Lesser General Public License (LGPL) and is intended to run on POSIX-compliant operating systems, including Linux but also Windows and Mac OS X. It is being used for audio/video conferencing on the Nokia 770, N800, N810 and N900. It is also the VoIP framework used by Meego.

Farsight is under development in the Farsight 2 series. The maintainer is Olivier Crête.

Examples of applications using Farstream:
 Pidgin
 Empathy
 aMSN
 MeeGo
 Gajim
 Minbif

References

External links
 Freedesktop project website

Free software programmed in C
Freedesktop.org
Free network-related software
Internet software for Linux
Software that uses GTK
Software that uses GStreamer
Collabora